Aubrey Santos Sandel-Miller (born March 16, 1982), known professionally as Aubrey Miles, is a Filipino television host, singer, model, and actress.

Early life
Aubrey Sandel was born on March 16, 1980, in Caloocan to Victorino Sandel and Maria Perla Santos. She was the third child of the couple's four children. She was named after the song "Aubrey" by Bread. Her parents separated when she was fifteen years old, and she stayed with her mother.

At nineteen years old, Miles starred in GMA sitcoms Beh Bote Nga and German Moreno's Best Friends. Between show business assignments, Miles joined beauty pageants which provided her with a steady income.

She finished her secondary education at La Consolacion College – Caloocan. She then majored in voice and minored in piano at the University of Santo Tomas Conservatory of Music. She dropped out during her second year when film producer Dondon Monteverde signed her up to a three-year, eight-film contract with Regal Films.

Career
Miles' stage surname was adopted from the song "Miles Away" by German Moreno. She made her film debut as Ditas, a student who moonlights as a prostitute in the 2002 film Prosti directed by Erik Matti. Her role involved nudity and graphic sex scenes with her on-screen romantic interest, Jay Manalo. Highly successful at the box office, the film grossed ₱29 million. To date, Prosti remains her highest-grossing movie. The success in the titular role led to other movie offers, as well as product endorsement deals from companies such as Bench (a clothing company in the Philippines). After Prosti, Miles starred in the movie Xerex (based on a tabloid sex advice column), where she played three different roles. Miles' next movie, Sanib, saw her play a character who is possessed by demons.

After securing a contract with the ABS-CBN television network she appeared as co-host of the daily noontime show Masayang Tanghali Bayan, and in several ABS-CBN sitcoms. As part of a strategy to build wider appeal, Miles also began appearing in more family friendly movie roles, in films like Sanib, A Beautiful Life, and Gagamboy – Regal Film's 2003 Metro Manila Film Festival entry – as actor Vhong Navarro's love interest.

Miles has three times appeared on the cover of FHM Philippines; she was a covergirl in 2002, 2004 – depicted covered in gold-paint for the magazine's 50th issue (it was "revived" in 15th anniversary of FHM in March 2015, portrayed by Fil-Malay model Nicole Alexandria), and in 2009. Miles was also one of three FHM Calendar Girls along with Maui Taylor and Diana Zubiri for the FHM 2003 calendar.

Teaming up with real-life best friend Jacqueline Yu, Miles was a contestant in The Amazing Race Asia 1. They finished in 9th place out of the 10 teams. She also joined Survivor Philippines: Celebrity Showdown and made it all the way to the end, Day 36 with Ervic Vijandre, Solenn Heussaff, and Akihiro Sato as the show's "Final Four". She was voted out live and became the 7th member of the jury. She came in fourth place.

For 12 years, she still included to the FHM 100 Sexiest Woman, which Diana Zubiri for 13 years and Angel Locsin and Jennylyn Mercado in 11-year run.

Personal life 
Miles has a son named John Maurie Sandel Obligacion, with her former boyfriend JP Obligacion. She was 20 years old when Maurie was born. Before a 2009 interview with Boy Abunda, she had hid her son from the public and consistently denied rumors to protect her career and sexy image.

She has been in a relationship with actor Troy Montero since 2003. They have two children together: son Hunter Cody Sandel Miller born on October 3, 2008, and daughter Rocket Miller born on December 14, 2018. The couple married on June 9, 2022, in a ceremony presided by Mandaluyong mayor Carmelita Abalos.

She operates a pawnshop business, A-MILES Pawnshop.

Filmography

Television

Film
 Si Agimat at si Enteng Kabisote (2011)
 Gagamboy: Ang Pagbabalik (2011)
 Super Noypi (2006)
 Exodus: Tales from the Enchanted Kingdom (2005) as Bangkila
 Lisensyadong kamao (2005) as Fanie
 Pa-siyam (2004) as Ruth
 Beautiful Life (2004) as Daisy
 Singles (2004) as Susie
 Kuya (2004) as Chloe
 Gagamboy (2004) as Liana
 Xerex the Series First Edition (2004) (Video)
 Sanib (2003) as Melissa
 Xerex (2003) as Breezy/Marge/Jasmin
 Prosti (2002) as Ditas

References 

sources
 Sicam, Edmund L. (2004) "", Planet Philippines
 Bautista, Mario E. (2002) "Aubrey is her name", Manila Standard Today

External links 
 
 Aubrey Miles on FHM.com.ph
 Aubrey Miles at Celebritiesph.com

1982 births
Filipino film actresses
Filipino television actresses
Filipino television presenters
Living people
People from Caloocan
Actresses from Metro Manila
University of Santo Tomas alumni
21st-century Filipino actresses
21st-century Filipino women singers
Filipino women television presenters
Participants in Philippine reality television series
The Amazing Race contestants
Survivor Philippines contestants
GMA Network personalities
ABS-CBN personalities